The 2nd Annual Premios Juventud (Youth Awards) were broadcast by Univision on September 22, 2005.

This was the last edition to be held in September.

Arrivals and presenters
 
 Anaís
 Angel & Kris
 Baby Ranks
 Banda El Recodo
 Carlos Calderón - TV personality
 Chayanne
 Cristian Castro
 Daddy Yankee
 Dj Kane
 Enrique Iglesias
 Frankie J
 Ivy Queen
 Jackie Guerrido
 Jaime Camil
 Jorge Ramos - TV personality
 Karla Martínez - TV personality
 Kate Del Castillo - Actress
 La Quinta Estación
 Laura Pausini
 Lena
 Lili Estefan - TV personality
 Luis Fonsi
 Obie Bermúdez
 Olga Tañón
 Pablo Montero
 Rafael Mercadante - Actor
 RBD
 Roberto Gómez Bolaños
 Shakira
 Sissi - TV personality
 Tonny Tun Tun
 Wisín & Yandel

Performers
 Anaís
 Angel & Khriz
 Baby Ranks - "Mayor Que Yo"
 Chayanne - "No Te Preocupes Por Mí"
 Cristian Castro - "Amor Eterno"
 Daddy Yankee - "Mayor Que Yo"
 Ivy Queen - "Cuéntale"
 La Quinta Estación - "Algo Más"
 Luis Fonsi - Nada Es Para Siempre
 Olga Tañón - "Vete Vete"
 RBD - "Solo Quédate En Silencio"
 Tonny Tun Tun - "Mayor Que Yo"
 Wisin & Yandel - "Mayor Que Yo"

Winners and nominees 
Daddy Yankee and Shakira were the leading nominees, both with 8 nominations. Mexican group RBD follows with 5 nominations in various categories.

The night's biggest winners were  Daddy Yankee and Shakira. Other takers included RBD and Jennifer Lopez, with four and two statuettes respectively. In Sports, famous baseball shortstop Alex Rodríguez ("Most Electrifying Guy Jock"), and Mexican track and field phenom Ana Guevara ("Most Electrifying Gal Jock") each received statuettes.

Music

Fashion and Images

Movies

Pop Culture

Sports

References 

Premios Juventud
Premios Juventud
Premios Juventud
Premios Juventud, 2005
Premios Juventud, 2005
Premios Juventud
Premios Juventud
2000s in Miami